The Niagara Lightning (formerly Niagara Thunder) are Canadian rugby union team based in southern Ontario. The team played in the Rugby Canada National Junior Championship and draws most of its players from the Niagara Rugby Union.

The Lightning play their "home" games in Hamilton (Mohawk Sports Park) and nearby Burlington, Oakville (Crusader Park), and Brantford.

History
In 1998, Rugby Canada and the provincial unions agreed to form the Rugby Canada Super League. Fourteen unions and sub-unions were invited to compete in the new semi-professional league. However, the Niagara Rugby Union (along with the Toronto Rugby Union and the Eastern Ontario Rugby Union) decided not to participate. Both Toronto and Eastern Ontario joined the league the following year, leaving Niagara as the only invited union not to join.

The Niagara Rugby Union finally decided to field a team in time for the 2004 RCSL season.  The new club was named the Niagara Thunder.

In 2012 the Niagara Rugby Union put together two Under 17, 7 aside teams in both the boys and girls divisions of the Ontario Summer Games held at York University. All 7 aside U-17 squads have since 2012 have played under the name Niagara Thunder, including the 2014 Ontario Summer Games held in Windsor.

External links 
 Hockey Database 

Sports teams in Hamilton, Ontario
Rugby union teams in Ontario
Rugby clubs established in 2004
2004 establishments in Ontario